Monsall is a tram stop on the Oldham and Rochdale Line (ORL) of Greater Manchester's light-rail Metrolink system in the Monsall area of Manchester in North West England. It was built as part of Phase 3a of the system's expansion, on the route of the former Oldham Loop Line, and opened to passengers on 13 June 2012.

The station is on the ex-Lancashire and Yorkshire Railway's Cheetham Hill Loop line between the former Thorpe's Bridge Junction (near Newton Heath TMD) and Irk Valley Junction, where the Oldham route joins the line from Bury en route to Victoria.

Service pattern 

Connecting bus routes
The 151, operated by Stotts tours, stops nearby and runs between Hightown and Hollinwood.

References

External links

 https://web.archive.org/web/20120211143030/http://www.lrta.org/Manchester/Oldham_Rochdale.html
Metrolink stop information
Monsall area map

Tram stops in Manchester
Railway stations in Great Britain opened in 2012
Tram stops on the East Didsbury to Rochdale line